Aliabad-e Tadayyon (also Romanized as ‘Alīābād-e Tadayyon) is a village in Azizabad Rural District, in the Central District of Narmashir County, Kerman Province, Iran. At the 2006 census, its population was 1,409, in 311 families.

References 

Populated places in Narmashir County